The 1900 United States House of Representatives elections were held for the most part on November 6, 1900, with Oregon, Maine, and Vermont holding theirs early in either June or September. They coincided with the re-election of President William McKinley. Elections were held for 357 seats of the United States House of Representatives, representing 45 states, to serve in the 57th United States Congress. Special elections were also held throughout the year.

McKinley's Republican Party gained thirteen seats from the Democratic Party and minor parties, cementing their majority. A reassertion of Republican control in the Mid-Atlantic was key in the gain of new seats. However, with an improved economy, especially in the industrial sector, the election cycle featured no keystone issue, resulting in a general support for the status quo. The fading Populist Party held on to five House seats, while the sole member of the Silver Party changed parties to Democratic. This was the last time a third party headed into house elections with a party leader. All subsequent third parties to serve in the House would not select a party leader.

Election summaries

The previous election of 1898 saw the election of 6 Populists, 2 Silver Republicans, and a Silver Party member.

Election dates 

All the states held their elections November 6, 1900, except for 3 states, with 8 seats among them:

June 4: Oregon
September 4: Vermont
September 10: Maine

Special elections 

|-
! 
| John Walter Smith
|  | Democratic
| 1898
|  | Incumbent resigned January 12, 1900.New member elected November 6, 1900.Republican gain.
| nowrap | 

|-
! 
| Alfred C. Harmer
|  | Republican
| 1876
|  | Incumbent died March 6, 1900.New member electedRepublican hold.
| nowrap | 

|-
! 
| Joseph Wheeler
|  | Democratic
| 1884
|  | Incumbent resigned April 20, 1900.New member electedDemocratic hold.
| nowrap | 

|-
! 
| John H. Hoffecker
|  | Republican
| 1898
|  | Incumbent died June 16, 1900.New member elected November 6, 1900.Republican hold.
| nowrap | 

|-
! 
| William Davis Daly
|  | Democratic
| 1898
|  | Incumbent died July 31, 1900.New member elected November 6, 1900.Democratic hold.
| nowrap | 

|-
! 
| Marion De Vries
|  | Democratic
| 1896
|  | Incumbent resigned August 20, 1900.New member elected November 6, 1900.Republican gain.
| nowrap | 

|-
! 

|-
! 

|}

J. William Stokes (Democratic) of  died in office on July 6, 1901, and was replaced in a special election by Asbury F. Lever (Democratic)

Alabama 

|-
! 

|-
! 

|-
! 

|-
! 

|-
! 

|-
! 

|-
! 

|-
! 

|-
! 

|}

Arkansas 

|-
! 

|-
! 

|-
! 

|-
! 

|-
! 

|-
! 

|}

California 

|-
! 
| John All Barham
|  | Republican
| 1894
|  | Incumbent retired.New member elected.Republican hold.
| nowrap | 

|-
! 
| Marion De Vries
|  | Democratic
| 1896
|  | Incumbent resigned August 20, 1900, to accept a judicial position.New member elected.Republican gain.
| nowrap | 

|-
! 
| Victor H. Metcalf
|  | Republican
| 1898
| Incumbent re-elected.
| nowrap | 

|-
! 
| Julius Kahn
|  | Republican
| 1898
| Incumbent re-elected.
| nowrap | 

|-
! 
| Eugene F. Loud
|  | Republican
| 1890
| Incumbent re-elected.
| nowrap | 

|-
! 
| Russell J. Waters
|  | Republican
| 1898
|  | Incumbent retired.New member elected.Republican hold
| nowrap | 

|-
! 
| James C. Needham
|  | Republican
| 1898
| Incumbent re-elected.
| nowrap | 

|}

Colorado 

|-
! 
| John F. Shafroth
|  | Silver Republican
| 1894
| Incumbent re-elected.
| nowrap | 

|-
! 
| John C. Bell
|  | Populist
| 1892
| Incumbent re-elected.
| nowrap | 

|}

Connecticut 

|-
! 

|-
! 

|-
! 

|-
! 

|}

Delaware 

|-
! 
| colspan=3 | Vacant
|  | Rep. John H. Hoffecker (R) died June 16, 1900.New member elected.Republican hold.
| nowrap | 

|}

Florida 

|-
! 
| Stephen M. Sparkman
|  | Democratic
| 1894
| Incumbent re-elected.
| nowrap | 

|-
! 
| Robert Wyche Davis
|  | Democratic
| 1896
| Incumbent re-elected.
| nowrap | 

|}

Georgia 

|-
! 

|-
! 

|-
! 

|-
! 

|-
! 

|-
! 

|-
! 

|-
! 

|-
! 

|-
! 

|-
! 

|}

Idaho 

|-
! 
| Edgar Wilson
|  | Silver Republican
| 1898
|  | Incumbent retired.New member elected.Populist gain.
| nowrap | 

|}

Illinois 

|-
! 

|-
! 

|-
! 

|-
! 

|-
! 

|-
! 

|-
! 

|-
! 

|-
! 

|-
! 

|-
! 

|-
! 

|-
! 

|-
! 

|-
! 

|-
! 

|-
! 

|-
! 

|-
! 

|-
! 

|-
! 

|-
! 

|}

Indiana 

|-
! 

|-
! 

|-
! 

|-
! 

|-
! 

|-
! 

|-
! 

|-
! 

|-
! 

|-
! 

|-
! 

|-
! 

|-
! 

|}

Iowa 

|-
! 

|-
! 

|-
! 

|-
! 

|-
! 

|-
! 

|-
! 

|-
! 

|-
! 

|-
! 

|-
! 

|}

Kansas 

|-
! 

|-
! 

|-
! 

|-
! 

|-
! 

|-
! 

|-
! 

|-
! 

|}

Kentucky 

|-
! 

|-
! 

|-
! 

|-
! 

|-
! 

|-
! 

|-
! 

|-
! 

|-
! 

|-
! 

|-
! 

|}

Louisiana 

|-
! 

|-
! 

|-
! 

|-
! 

|-
! 

|-
! 

|}

Maine 

|-
! 

|-
! 

|-
! 

|-
! 

|}

Maryland 

|-
! 
| John Walter Smith
|  | Democratic
| 1898
|  | Incumbent resigned January 12, 1900, upon being elected Governor.New member elected.Republican gain.
| nowrap | 

|-
! 
| William Benjamin Baker
|  | Republican
| 1894
|  | Incumbent retired.New member elected.Republican hold
| nowrap | 

|-
! 
| Frank C. Wachter
|  | Republican
| 1898
| Incumbent re-elected.
| nowrap | 

|-
! 
| James W. Denny
|  | Democratic
| 1898
|  | Incumbent lost re-election. New member elected. Republican gain.
| nowrap | 

|-
! 
| Sydney Emanuel Mudd I
|  | Republican
| 1896
| Incumbent re-elected.
| nowrap | 

|-
! 
| George A. Pearre
|  | Republican
| 1898
| Incumbent re-elected
| nowrap | 

|}

Massachusetts 

|-
! 
| George P. Lawrence
|  | Republican
| 1897 (special)
| Incumbent re-elected.
| nowrap | 

|-
! 
| Frederick H. Gillett
|  | Republican
| 1892
| Incumbent re-elected.
| nowrap | 

|-
! 
| John R. Thayer
|  | Democratic
| 1898
| Incumbent re-elected.
| nowrap | 

|-
! 
| George W. Weymouth
|  | Republican
| 1892
|  | Incumbent retired.New member elected.Republican hold.
| nowrap | 

|-
! 
| William S. Knox
|  | Republican
| 1894
| Incumbent re-elected.
| nowrap | 

|-
! 
| William H. Moody
|  | Republican
| 1895 (special)
| Incumbent re-elected.
| nowrap | 

|-
! 
| Ernest W. Roberts
|  | Republican
| 1898
| Incumbent re-elected.
| nowrap | 

|-
! 
| Samuel W. McCall
|  | Republican
| 1892
| Incumbent re-elected.
| nowrap | 

|-
! 
| John F. Fitzgerald
|  | Democratic
| 1894
|  | Incumbent retired.New member elected.Democratic hold.
| nowrap | 

|-
! 
| Henry F. Naphen
|  | Democratic
| 1898
| Incumbent re-elected.
| nowrap | 

|-
! 
| Charles F. Sprague
|  | Republican
| 1892
|  | Incumbent retired.New member elected.Republican hold.
| nowrap | 

|-
! 
| William C. Lovering
|  | Republican
| 1896
| Incumbent re-elected.
| nowrap | 

|-
! 
| William S. Greene
|  | Republican
| 1898 (special)
| Incumbent re-elected.
| nowrap | 

|}

Michigan 

|-
! 

|-
! 

|-
! 

|-
! 

|-
! 

|-
! 

|-
! 

|-
! 

|-
! 

|-
! 

|-
! 

|-
! 

|}

Minnesota 

|-
! 

|-
! 

|-
! 

|-
! 

|-
! 

|-
! 

|-
! 

|}

Mississippi 

|-
! 
| John M. Allen
|  | Democratic
| 1884
|  | Incumbent retired.New member elected.Democratic hold.
| nowrap | 

|-
! 
| Thomas Spight
|  | Democratic
| 1898 (special)
| Incumbent re-elected.
| nowrap | 

|-
! 
| Thomas C. Catchings
|  | Democratic
| 1884
|  | Incumbent retired.New member elected.Democratic hold
| nowrap | 

|-
! 
| Andrew F. Fox
|  | Democratic
| 1896
| Incumbent re-elected.
| nowrap | 

|-
! 
| John S. Williams
|  | Democratic
| 1892
| Incumbent re-elected.
| nowrap | 

|-
! 
| Frank A. McLain
|  | Democratic
| 1898 (special)
| Incumbent re-elected.
| nowrap | 

|-
! 
| Patrick Henry
|  | Democratic
| 1896
|  | Incumbent lost renomination.New member elected.Democratic hold.
| nowrap | 

|}

Missouri 

|-
! 

|-
! 

|-
! 

|-
! 

|-
! 

|-
! 

|-
! 

|-
! 

|-
! 

|-
! 

|-
! 

|-
! 

|-
! 

|-
! 

|-
! 

|}

Montana  

|-
! 
| Albert J. Campbell
|  | Democratic
| 1898
|  |Incumbent retired.New member elected.Populist gain.
| nowrap | 

|}

Nebraska 

|-
! 
| Elmer Burkett
|  | Republican
| 1898
| Incumbent re-elected.
| nowrap | 

|-
! 
| David H. Mercer
|  | Republican
| 1892
| Incumbent re-elected.
| nowrap | 

|-
! 
| John S. Robinson
|  | Democratic
| 1898
| Incumbent re-elected.
| nowrap | 

|-
! 
| William L. Stark
|  | Populist
| 1896
| Incumbent re-elected.
| nowrap | 

|-
! 
| Roderick Dhu Sutherland
|  | Populist
| 1896
|  | Incumbent retired.New member elected.Democratic gain.
| nowrap | 

|-
! 
| William Neville
|  | Populist
| 1899 (special)
| Incumbent re-elected.
| nowrap | 

|}

Nevada 

|-
! 
| Francis G. Newlands
|  | Democratic
| 1892
| Incumbent re-elected.
| nowrap | 

|}

New Hampshire 

|-
! 

|-
! 

|}

New Jersey 

|-
! 

|-
! 

|-
! 

|-
! 

|-
! 

|-
! 

|-
! 

|-
! 

|}

New York 

|-
! 

|-
! 

|-
! 

|-
! 

|-
! 

|-
! 

|-
! 

|-
! 

|-
! 

|-
! 

|-
! 

|-
! 

|-
! 

|-
! 

|-
! 

|-
! 

|-
! 

|-
! 

|-
! 

|-
! 

|-
! 

|-
! 

|-
! 

|-
! 

|-
! 

|-
! 

|-
! 

|-
! 

|-
! 

|-
! 

|-
! 

|-
! 

|-
! 

|-
! 

|}

North Carolina 

|-
! 

|-
! 

|-
! 

|-
! 

|-
! 

|-
! 

|-
! 

|-
! 

|-
! 

|}

North Dakota  

|-
! 
| Burleigh F. Spalding
|  | Republican
| 1898
|  | Incumbent retired.New member elected.Republican hold.
| nowrap | 

|}

Ohio 

|-
! 

|-
! 

|-
! 

|-
! 

|-
! 

|-
! 

|-
! 

|-
! 

|-
! 

|-
! 

|-
! 

|-
! 

|-
! 

|-
! 

|-
! 

|-
! 

|-
! 

|-
! 

|-
! 

|-
! 

|-
! 

|}

Oregon 

|-
! 
| Thomas H. Tongue
|  | Republican
| 1896
| Incumbent re-elected.
| nowrap | 

|-
! 
| Malcolm A. Moody
|  | Republican
| 1898
| Incumbent re-elected.
| nowrap | 

|}

Pennsylvania 

|-
! 

|-
! 

|-
! 

|-
! 

|-
! 

|-
! 

|-
! 

|-
! 

|-
! 

|-
! 

|-
! 

|-
! 

|-
! 

|-
! 

|-
! 

|-
! 

|-
! 

|-
! 

|-
! 

|-
! 

|-
! 

|-
! 

|-
! 

|-
! 

|-
! 

|-
! 

|-
! 

|-
! 

|-
! rowspan=2 | 

|}

Rhode Island 

|-
! 

|-
! 

|}

South Carolina 

|-
! 
| William Elliott
|  | Democratic
| 18861890 18901892 18941896 1896
| Incumbent re-elected.
| nowrap | 

|-
! 
| W. Jasper Talbert
|  | Democratic
| 1892
| Incumbent re-elected.
| nowrap | 

|-
! 
| Asbury Latimer
|  | Democratic
| 1892
| Incumbent re-elected.
| nowrap | 

|-
! 
| Stanyarne Wilson
|  | Democratic
| 1894
|  | Incumbent lost renomination.New member elected.Democratic hold
| nowrap | 

|-
! 
| David E. Finley
|  | Democratic
| 1898
| Incumbent re-elected.
| nowrap | 

|-
! 
| James Norton
|  | Democratic
| 1897 
|  | Incumbent lost renomination.New member elected.Democratic hold
| nowrap | 

|-
! 
| J. William Stokes
|  | Democratic
| 1894
| Incumbent re-elected.
| nowrap | 

|}

South Dakota  

|-
! rowspan=2 | 
| Charles H. Burke
|  | Republican
| 1898
| Incumbent re-elected.
| rowspan=2 nowrap | 

|-
| Robert J. Gamble
|  | Republican
| 1898
|  | Incumbent retired to run for U.S. senator.New member elected.Republican hold.

|}

Tennessee  

|-
! 
| Walter P. Brownlow
|  | Republican
| 1896
| Incumbent re-elected.
| nowrap | 

|-
! 
| Henry R. Gibson
|  | Republican
| 1894
| Incumbent re-elected.
| nowrap | 

|-
! 
| John A. Moon
|  | Democratic
| 1896
| Incumbent re-elected.
| nowrap | 

|-
! 
| Charles E. Snodgrass
|  | Democratic
| 1898
| Incumbent re-elected.
|  nowrap | 

|-
! 
| James D. Richardson
|  | Democratic
| 1884
| Incumbent re-elected.
| nowrap | 

|-
! 
| John W. Gaines
|  | Democratic
| 1896
| Incumbent re-elected.
| nowrap | 

|-
! 
| Nicholas N. Cox
|  | Democratic
| 1890
|  |Incumbent retired.New member elected.Democratic hold.
| nowrap | 

|-
! 
| Thetus W. Sims
|  | Democratic
| 1896
| Incumbent re-elected.
| nowrap | 

|-
! 
| Rice A. Pierce
|  | Democratic
| 1896
| Incumbent re-elected.
| nowrap | 

|-
! 
| Edward W. Carmack
|  | Democratic
| 1896
|  |Incumbent retired to run for U.S. senator.New member elected.Democratic hold.
| 

|}

Texas 

|-
! 

|-
! 

|-
! 

|-
! 

|-
! 

|-
! 

|-
! 

|-
! 

|-
! 

|-
! 

|-
! 

|-
! 

|-
! 

|}

Utah  

|-
! 
| William H. King
|  | Democratic
| 1900 
|  | Incumbent lost re-election.New member elected.Republican gain.
| nowrap | 

|}

Vermont 

|-
! 

|-
! 

|}

Virginia 

|-
! 

|-
! 

|-
! 

|-
! 

|-
! 

|-
! 

|-
! 

|-
! 

|-
! 

|-
! 

|}

Washington  

|-
! rowspan=2 | 
| Wesley Livsey Jones
|  | Republican
| 1898
| Incumbent re-elected.
| nowrap rowspan=2 | 

|-
| Francis W. Cushman
|  | Republican
| 1898
| Incumbent re-elected.

|}

West Virginia 

|-
! 
| Blackburn B. Dovener
|  | Republican
| 1894
| Incumbent re-elected.
| nowrap | 

|-
! 
| Alston G. Dayton
|  | Republican
| 1894
| Incumbent re-elected.
| nowrap | 

|-
! 
| David E. Johnston
|  | Democratic
| 1898
|  | Incumbent lost re-election.New member elected.Republican gain.
| nowrap | 

|-
! 
| Romeo H. Freer
|  | Republican
| 1898
|  | Incumbent retired to run for Attorney General of West Virginia.New member elected.Republican hold.
| nowrap | 

|}

Wisconsin 

|-
! 

|-
! 

|-
! 

|-
! 

|-
! 

|-
! 

|-
! 

|-
! 

|-
! 

|-
! 

|}

Wyoming  

|-
! 
| Frank W. Mondell
|  | Republican
| 1898
| Incumbent re-elected.
| nowrap | 

|}

Non-voting delegates

Arizona Territory 

|-
! 
| John F. Wilson
|  | Democratic
| 1898
|  | Incumbent lost renomination.New member elected.Democratic hold.
| nowrap | 

|}

Hawaii Territory 

|-
! 
| colspan=3 | None 
| bgcolor= | New seat.New member elected.Home Rule gain.
| nowrap | 

|}

New Mexico Territory 

|-
! 
| Pedro Perea
|  | Republican
| 1898
|  | Incumbent retired.New member elected.Republican hold.
| nowrap | 

|}

Oklahoma Territory 

|-
! 
| Dennis T. Flynn
|  | Republican
| 18921894 1898
| Incumbent re-elected.
| nowrap | 

|}

Puerto Rico 

|-
! 
| colspan=3 | None 
|  | New seat.New member elected.Republican gain.
| nowrap | 

|}

See also
 1900 United States elections
 1900 United States presidential election
 1900–01 United States Senate elections
 56th United States Congress
 57th United States Congress

Notes

References

Bibliography

External links
 Office of the Historian (Office of Art & Archives, Office of the Clerk, U.S. House of Representatives)